Pidonia is a genus of beetles in the family Cerambycidae, containing the following species:

 Pidonia aurata (Horn, 1860)
 Pidonia densicollis (Casey, 1914)
 Pidonia gnathoides (LeConte, 1873)
 Pidonia lurida (Fabricius, 1792)
 Pidonia quadrata (Hopping, 1931)
 Pidonia ruficollis (Say, 1824)
 Pidonia scripta (LeConte, 1869)

References

Lepturinae